This is a list of Northamptonshire's List A cricket records; that is, record team and individual performances in List A cricket for Northamptonshire County Cricket Club.

Most List A runs for Northamptonshire

Qualification - 6000 runs 

Most List A wickets for Northamptonshire

Qualification - 130 wickets 

Team totals

Batting

Record partnership for each wicket

Bowling

Wicket-keeping

References

External links
Cricket Archive Records

List A records
Lists of English cricket records and statistics
List A cricket records